Pseudocalamobius discolineatus is a species of beetle in the family Cerambycidae. It was described by Pic in 1927.

References

Agapanthiini
Beetles described in 1927